Boger–Hartsell Farm is a historic home and farm located near Concord, Cabarrus County, North Carolina. The farmhouse was built in 1882, and is a one-story, "L" shaped dwelling with Italianate and Greek Revival style design elements.  Also on the property are the contributing log barn (c. 1872), a log corncrib (c. 1885), a well house and canopy (c. 1885), a granary (c. 1913), a smokehouse (c. 1939), a hen house (c. 1937), and a washhouse (c. 1940).

It was listed on the National Register of Historic Places in 1998.

References

Farms on the National Register of Historic Places in North Carolina
Greek Revival houses in North Carolina
Italianate architecture in North Carolina
Houses completed in 1882
Houses in Cabarrus County, North Carolina
National Register of Historic Places in Cabarrus County, North Carolina